Whatever is the fourth studio album by  R&B group The Friends of Distinction, released in 1970 on the RCA Victor label.

Commercial performance
The album peaked at No. 42 on the R&B albums chart. It also reached No. 179 on the Billboard 200. The album features the single, "Time Waits for No One", which peaked at No. 60 on the Billboard Hot 100 and No. 37 on the Hot Soul Singles chart.

Track listing

Personnel 

Floyd Butler, Barbara Jean Love, Charlene Gibson, Harry Elston – vocals
Jerry Peters, Joe Sample – keyboards
Ray Cork, Jr. – keyboards, percussion, trumpet
Louie Shelton, Greg Poree, David T. Walker – guitar
Wilton Felder – electric bass
Gary Coleman, Kenneth Watson – percussion
King Errison – congas
Toxey French, Edward Greene – drums
Jimmy Getzoff – violin, concertmaster
Nathan Ross – violin
Samuel Boghossian – viola
Armand Kaproff – cello
Plas Johnson, William Green – woodwinds
Jay Migliori – baritone saxophone
Paul Hubinon, John Audino – trumpet, flugelhorn
Richard Nash – trombone, baritone horn

Charts 
Album

Singles

References

External links 
 

1970 albums
The Friends of Distinction albums
RCA Records albums